Phryganopsis atrescens is a moth of the subfamily Arctiinae. It was described by George Hampson in 1903. It is found in the Eastern Cape of South Africa.

References

 

Endemic moths of South Africa
Lithosiini
Moths described in 1903